Coleophora lenae is a moth of the family Coleophoridae. It is found in North Macedonia.

The larvae feed on Achillea coarctata. They create a greyish brown, hairy and very variable lobe case of 9–11 mm. The mouth angle is 35-45°. Larvae can be found in early May.

References

lenae
Moths described in 1969
Moths of Europe